Moner Mohammad Abu Salha (also Munir Mohammed Abou Saleha aka Abu Hurayra al-Amriki) (October 28, 1991 – May 25, 2014), was an American suicide bomber who killed himself and several Syrian troops with a truck bomb in Ariha, Syria in the name of al-Nusra Front.

Biography
Salha was raised in Vero Beach, Florida, by a Sunni Palestinian father and an Italian-American mother. At the age of 22, he became the first known American suicide bomber to die in Syria. He produced a video describing his motivation to die on behalf of the al-Nusra Front.

Salha's name later came up as a contact in an unsuccessful 2014 investigation by the Federal Bureau of Investigation. The subject of that investigation was Omar Mateen, who would later commit the 2016 Orlando nightclub shooting.  The investigation was motivated "because Abu-Salha and Mateen attended the same mosque," law-enforcement officials told the Wall Street Journal.  During the shooting, Mateen told a 9-1-1 operator that the shooting was inspired by Abu-Salha. In the video published by al-Nusra, Salha said that he was being watched by the FBI before he left for Syria, and that he moved to stay with friends in the state of Florida in order to throw the FBI off track and make them believe he was in the United States after he had left. Both Salha and Mateen lived in Fort Pierce, Florida.

References

American Islamists
American Sunni Muslims
Al-Nusra Front members
1991 births
2014 suicides
Filmed suicides
American people of Palestinian descent
American people of Italian descent
People from Vero Beach, Florida
People of the Syrian civil war
Islamist suicide bombers
Mass murder in 2014
American mass murderers

Islamist mass murderers